Itamar Ben-Avi ([]; 31 July 1882 – 8 April 1943) was the first native speaker of Hebrew in modern times. He was a journalist and Zionist activist.

Biography

Itamar Ben-Avi was born as Ben-Zion Ben-Yehuda in Jerusalem on 31 July 1882, the son of Devora and Eliezer Ben-Yehuda. Eliezer is credited with reviving the Hebrew language; Itamar was brought up to be the first native speaker of Hebrew in the modern era. At his father's insistence, Itamar was not permitted to hear any language other than Hebrew at home. When he was very young, Itamar always wanted someone to play with, but his parents did not want him to speak with the other children who spoke different languages. He made friends with a dog which he called Ma'her, meaning "fast" in Hebrew. His three siblings died in a diphtheria epidemic and his mother died of tuberculosis in 1891. He and his family were ostracized from the ultra-orthodox community, due to their usage of Hebrew as a day-to-day language. The religious community saw this as sacrilege because they viewed it as the language of the Torah and prayers, and not for use in "idle chatter."

After his mother's death in 1891, his father married her younger sister, the writer Hemda Ben-Yehuda (née Beila Jonas), so Itamar's aunt became his stepmother. After his mother's death, he changed his name to Itamar, as that was the name his parents originally intended to give him (named after the priest Ithamar). The name Itamar means "Island of Dates" and derives from the Hebrew word tamar (date or palm tree), which is a symbol of Zionism. As his last name, he used Ben-Avi. Avi is an acronym (as indicated by the use of the character ) for Eliezer Ben Yehuda (as written in Hebrew) and also means "my father", so Ben-Avi means "my father's son".

At the age of 19, Ben-Avi sailed to Europe and studied at universities in Paris and Berlin. He returned to Palestine in 1908 as a journalist, joining his father in editing and writing Hebrew newspapers.

Ben-Avi married Leah Abushedid (1889–1982), born in Jerusalem to a wealthy Moroccan-Jewish family. Ben-Avi met her when he was 23 and she was 16. Due to his poor financial situation, his Ashkenazi background, and their age difference, Abushedid's parents did not approve of their marriage. Hoping to convince her parents, he published poems proclaiming his love for her in HaOr. After three years, when he published a poem about suicide, they relented and permitted the marriage. After two years of negotiating the marriage contract, the couple married in 1914. They had three daughters: Dror-Eilat (1917–1921), Drora (1922–1981), and Rina (1925–2016). Drora and Rina became radio news broadcasters.

In 1919, he founded a Hebrew daily newspaper called Doar HaYom (The Daily Mail), and ran it until 1929. In addition, he was a Zionist activist and officer with Bnei Binyamin and the Jewish National Fund. He served as a Jewish National Fund emissary to various countries. Together with Oved Ben-Ami, he helped raise the funds for the founding of Netanya.

In 1939, as his financial situation deteriorated and in need of a steady income, Ben-Avi left his family for the United States to take up a posting as the Jewish National Fund representative in New York City. He died there in 1943 at the age of 60, five years before the establishment of Israel. His body was brought back to Palestine for burial in 1947, and was buried on the Mount of Olives in Jerusalem.

Journalism and literary career

He was the chief editor and journalist of Doar HaYom, the then Hebrew style-twin of the British Daily Mail, from 1920 to 1933. In his numerous opinion and commentary articles in Doar HaYom he also advocated the widespread use of the International language Esperanto.

Ben-Avi was an advocate for the Romanization of Hebrew. He favored the Latin alphabet, a full alphabet with vowel letters, rather than the traditional Hebrew alphabet, a consonantal orthography of Hebrew (with limited matres lectionis) using "squared Assyrian letters". The Hebrew writing system dates back to the time of Ezra the scribe, 500 BCE.

He wrote a Hebrew biography of his father. This biography was titled Avi ("My Father") and was printed in his own made-up version of a Hebrew alphabet using Latin letters and some variations thereof. He pioneered and was chief editor of two short lived Hebrew weeklies in reformed Latin script. The first was Hashavua Hapalestini (The Palestinian Week, 1928) and the second was Dror (Liberty, 1934).

References

External links
 The personal papers of Ben-Avi are kept at the   Central Zionist Archives in Jerusalem. The notation of the record group is A43.

1882 births
1943 deaths
Zionist activists
Hebrew language
Members of the Assembly of Representatives (Mandatory Palestine)
Burials at the Jewish cemetery on the Mount of Olives
Mandatory Palestine people of Belarusian-Jewish descent
Ashkenazi Jews in Ottoman Palestine
Ashkenazi Jews in Mandatory Palestine
Esperanto speaking Jews
Hebrew-language poets
Modern Hebrew writers
Modern Hebrew